Eugene J. Bedell (May 13, 1928 – January 4, 2016) was an American politician who served in the New Jersey General Assembly from 1972 to 1974 from District 5B and in the New Jersey Senate from the 12th Legislative District from 1974 to 1982.

Born in Elizabeth, New Jersey, Bedell moved to Keansburg, New Jersey as a teenager and graduated in 1946 from Leonardo High School (since renamed as Middletown High School North).

He died on January 4, 2016, at his home in Keansburg, New Jersey at age 87.

References

1928 births
2016 deaths
Democratic Party New Jersey state senators
Democratic Party members of the New Jersey General Assembly
Middletown High School North alumni
Politicians from Elizabeth, New Jersey
Politicians from Union County, New Jersey
People from Keansburg, New Jersey